This article contains opinion polling by U.S. state for the 2016 Republican Party presidential primaries. The shading for each poll indicates the candidate(s) which are within one margin of error of the poll's leader.

For the significance of the earliest state votes, the Iowa caucuses and the New Hampshire primary, see United States presidential primary – Iowa and New Hampshire. For when any given state votes, see Republican Party presidential primaries, 2016 – Schedule of primaries and caucuses.

Alabama

Winner  Donald Trump
Primary date March 1, 2016

Alaska

Winner  Ted Cruz
Primary date March 1, 2016

Arizona

Winner  Donald Trump
Primary date March 22, 2016

Arkansas

Winner  Donald Trump
Primary date March 1, 2016

California

Winner  Donald Trump
Primary date June 7, 2016

Colorado

Winner  Ted Cruz
Primary date June 7, 2016

Connecticut

Winner  Donald Trump
Primary date April 26, 2016

Delaware

Winner  Donald Trump
Primary date April 26, 2016

District of Columbia

Winner  Marco Rubio
Primary date March 12, 2016

Florida

Winner  Donald Trump
Primary date March 15, 2016

Georgia

Winner  Donald Trump
Primary date March 1, 2016

Hawaii

Winner  Donald Trump
Caucus date March 8, 2016

Idaho

Winner  Ted Cruz
Primary date March 8, 2016

Illinois

Winner  Donald Trump
Primary date March 15, 2016

Indiana

Winner  Donald Trump
Primary date May 3, 2016

Iowa

Winner  Ted Cruz
Caucus date February 1, 2016

Kansas

Winner  Ted Cruz
Caucus date March 5, 2016

Kentucky

Winner  Donald Trump
Caucus date March 5, 2016

Louisiana

Winner  Donald Trump
Primary date March 5, 2016

Maine

Winner  Ted Cruz
Caucus date March 5, 2016

Maryland

Winner  Donald Trump
Primary date April 26, 2016

Massachusetts

Winner  Donald Trump
Primary date March 1, 2016

Michigan

Winner  Donald Trump
Primary date March 8, 2016

Minnesota

Winner  Marco Rubio
Primary date March 1, 2016

Mississippi

Winner  Donald Trump
Primary date March 8, 2016

Missouri

Winner  Donald Trump
Primary date March 15, 2016

Montana

Nebraska

Winner  Donald Trump
Primary date May 10, 2016

Nevada

Winner  Donald Trump
Caucus date February 23, 2016

New Hampshire

New Jersey

New Mexico

New York

Winner  Donald Trump
Primary date April 19, 2016

North Carolina

Winner  Donald Trump
Primary date March 15, 2016

Ohio

Winner  John Kasich
Primary date March 15, 2016

Oklahoma

Winner  Ted Cruz
Primary date March 1, 2016

Oregon

Winner  Donald Trump
Primary date May 17, 2016

Pennsylvania

Winner  Donald Trump
Primary date April 26, 2016

Rhode Island

Winner  Donald Trump
Primary date April 26, 2016

South Carolina

Winner  Donald Trump
Primary date February 20, 2016

South Dakota

Winner  Donald Trump
Primary date June 7, 2016

Tennessee

Winner  Donald Trump
Primary date March 1, 2016

Texas

Winner  Ted Cruz
Primary date March 1, 2016

Utah

Winner  Ted Cruz
Primary date March 22, 2016

Vermont

Winner  Donald Trump
Primary date March 1, 2016

Virginia

Winner  Donald Trump
Primary date March 1, 2016

Washington

Winner  Donald Trump
Primary date May 24, 2016

West Virginia

Winner  Donald Trump
Primary date May 10, 2016

Wisconsin

Winner  Ted Cruz
Primary date April 5, 2016

Wyoming

See also
General election polling
Nationwide opinion polling for the United States presidential election, 2016
Nationwide opinion polling for the United States presidential election by demographics, 2016
Statewide opinion polling for the United States presidential election, 2016

Democratic primary polling
Nationwide opinion polling for the Democratic Party 2016 presidential primaries
Statewide opinion polling for the Democratic Party presidential primaries, 2016

Republican primary polling
Nationwide opinion polling for the Republican Party 2016 presidential primaries

References 

Opinion polling for the 2016 United States presidential election
2016 United States Republican presidential primaries